is a Japanese footballer who plays for Tochigi SC.

Club statistics
Updated to end of 2018 season.

References

External links
Profile at Machida Zelvia

Profile at Sanfrecce Hiroshima

1995 births
Living people
Association football people from Hiroshima Prefecture
Japanese footballers
J1 League players
J2 League players
J3 League players
Sanfrecce Hiroshima players
Roasso Kumamoto players
FC Machida Zelvia players
Ehime FC players
Tochigi SC players
J.League U-22 Selection players
Association football defenders